Sarcomyxa serotina is a species of fungus in the family Sarcomyxaceae. Its recommended English name in the UK is olive oysterling. In North America it is known as late fall oyster. Fruit bodies grow as greenish, overlapping fan- or oyster-shaped caps on the wood of both coniferous and deciduous trees. The gills on the underside are closely spaced, bright orange yellow, and have an adnate attachment to the stipe. It produces a yellow spore print; spores are smooth, amyloid, and measure 4–6 by 1–2 µm.

The species is considered to be either edible or inedible, with the taste ranging from mild to bitter. Research has revealed that two separate species exist, Sarcomyxa serotina and Sarcomyxa edulis (unknown in Europe). The latter is cultivated for food in China and Japan.

References

Fungi described in 1793
Fungi of Asia
Fungi of Europe
Fungi of North America